Attorney General Edwards may refer to:

Ninian Wirt Edwards (1809–1889), Attorney General of Illinois
W. Cary Edwards (1944–2010), Attorney General of New Jersey

See also
Cheryl Edwardes (born 1950), Attorney-General of Western Australia